The 1961–62 season was Galatasaray's 58th in existence and the 4th consecutive season in the 1. Lig. This article shows statistics of the club's players in the season, and also lists all matches that the club have played in the season.

Squad statistics

Players in / out

In

Out

Milli Lig

Standings

Matches
Kick-off listed in local time (EET)

Balkans Cup

Group A

Friendly Matches
Kick-off listed in local time (EET)

Tournament

Eski Muharip Kupası

Doğuya Yardim Kampanyasi

Friendly match in Ankara

Attendances

References

 Tuncay, Bülent (2002). Galatasaray Tarihi. Yapı Kredi Yayınları

External links
 Galatasaray Sports Club Official Website 
 Turkish Football Federation – Galatasaray A.Ş. 
 uefa.com – Galatasaray AŞ

Galatasaray S.K. (football) seasons
Turkish football clubs 1961–62 season
Turkish football championship-winning seasons
1960s in Istanbul